Bombo is a Broadway musical with a book and lyrics by Harold R. Atteridge and music by Sigmund Romberg.

Produced by Lee Shubert and J. J. Shubert, the Broadway production, staged by J. C. Huffman, opened on October 6, 1921 at the Jolson's 59th Street Theatre, where it ran for 219 performances.  The cast included Al Jolson and Janet Adair.

The musical has a thin story designed to showcase Jolson, who was at the height of his popularity. Songs were added by several composers during the run of the show so that, by the end of the run, there were more songs by composers other than Romberg than by him. The success of the musical on Broadway led to a national tour.

Plot
Gus (played by Jolson in blackface) is a man living in Genoa, Italy in 1921 who finds himself transported back in time to Spain in 1492. Adopting the name "Bombo", Gus meets the explorer Christopher Columbus and becomes a slave whom Columbus brings along on his first voyage to the New World.

Songs
 Any Place Will Do With You
 April Showers (words by B. G. de Sylva; music by Louis Silvers)
 Arcady (words & music by Jolson & DeSylva)
 The Barber In Seville (words and music by DeSylva and Jolson)
 Barefoot Days (by Al Wilson & Jas. A. Brennan)
 California, Here I Come (by Jolson, DeSylva & Joseph Meyer)
 Coo-Coo Song (words by Jolson and DeSylva)
 Dirty Hands, Dirty Face (lyric by Jolson, Grant Clarke & Edgar Leslie; music by James V. Monaco)
 Don't Cry, Swanee (by Jolson, DeSylva & Con Conrad)
 Don't Send Your Wife to the Country (words by DeSylva; music by Silvers)
 Down South (words by DeSylva; music by Walter Donaldson)
 Give Me My Mammy (words by DeSylva; music by Donaldson)
 I'm Goin’ South (words and music by Abner Silver and Harry Woods)
 In Old Granada
 In the Way Off There
 It's You (words by DeSylva; music by Silvers)
 Jazzadadadoo
 Koo-Kee-Koo (words by Kiang Zaney; music by Nacio Herb Brown)
 Last Night on the Back Porch (by Lew Brown & Carl Schraubstader)
 Morning Will Come (by Jolson, DeSylva & Conrad)
 Oh, Oh, Columbus
 Old Fashioned Girl (words and music by Jolson)
 Tallahassee (words by DeSylva; music by Silvers)
 Tell Me With Smiles (by Cliff Friend and Walter Hirsch)
 Toot, Toot, Tootsie (Goo’ Bye) (Words and music by Gus Kahn, Ernie Erdman & Dan Russo)
 The Very Next Girl I See
 Wetona
 Who Cares? (words by Jack Yellen; music by Milton Ager)
 Yoo-Hoo (lyrics by DeSylva; melody by Jolson)

References

External links
 

1921 musicals
Broadway musicals
Musicals by Sigmund Romberg
Fiction about time travel
Christopher Columbus